The 1986 United States Senate election in Alaska was held on November 4, 1986. Incumbent Republican United States Senator Frank Murkowski ran for a second term in the United States Senate and was primarily opposed by Alaska Pacific University President Glenn Olds. Following a highly competitive election in 1980, Murkowski faced a legitimate opponent in Glenn Olds, and the contest was fairly close. However, in the end, Murkowski was able to defeat Olds by a slightly wider margin than he won by six years prior.

Open primary

Candidates

Republican
 Frank Murkowski, incumbent United States Senator since 1981, former banker and commissioner of the Alaska Department of Economic Development

Democratic
 Glenn Olds, president of Alaska Pacific University
 Bill Barnes, former director of the People Mover transit system in Anchorage.  His wife, Allegra, was the Libertarian nominee for lieutenant governor in this same election year
 Dave Carlson, former congressional candidate
 Michael J. Bruner
 Karl Francis

Libertarian
 Chuck House, field representative for Eastman Kodak Company and Libertarian Party activist

Results

General election

Results

See also 
 1986 United States Senate elections

References

External links 

Senate
Alaska
1986